Moussa Limane (born 7 May 1992) is a Central African Republic international footballer who plays for the Canadian club Scarborough SC, as a striker.

Club career

Africa 
Born in Bangui, Limane played in the Central African Republic League in 2010 with DFC8. Throughout his tenure with the Bangui-based team, he was the club's top goal scorer for two consecutive years between 2010 and 2011. Further silverware was added to DFC8's trophy cabinet by winning the Central African Republic Coupe Nationale in 2010 and the league title the following season. He played abroad in 2011 in the Sudan Premier League with Al-Ahly Shendi. In 2012, he returned to his former club DFC8 where he served as the team captain. During his second tenure with DFC, he played in the 2012 CAF Champions League against Les Astres FC. He returned to Shendi in 2013 where he would play for two seasons.

Kazakhstan 
After several seasons in Africa, he began playing in Central Asia in the Kazakhstan First League with FC Kyzylzhar in 2015. He would sign with league rivals Caspiy the following season where he played in 20 matches and recorded 4 goals. Limane was also a recipient of the Bamara Trophy in 2016. After the conclusion of the 2016 season, he had a trial run with FC Mulhouse but failed to secure a contract. As a result, he re-signed with Caspiy for the 2017 season. Throughout the season he was named the player of the month in June 2017 and finished the campaign with seven goals.

Scarborough SC 
In August 2020 he signed for the Canadian club Scarborough SC. In his debut season with Scarborough, he assisted in securing the First Division title and finished as the league's top goalscorer. He also assisted the club in reaching the CSL Championship final against FC Vorkuta but was defeated by a score of 2-1. 

The following season he assisted Scarborough in securing a postseason berth by finishing second in the standings. In the opening round of the playoffs, he contributed two goals against the Serbian White Eagles which helped the club to advance to the championship final. He featured in the championship final against Vorkuta and registered two goals which secured the title for Scarborough. He also helped Scarborough reach the final of the ProSound Cup but was defeated in a penalty shootout by Vorkuta. 

He re-signed with Scarborough for the 2022 season. Throughout the 2022 campaign, the eastern Toronto side would achieve an 18-game undefeated streak and playoff position by finishing third. Limane made his third championship appearance, which Scarborough lost to FC Continentals (formerly FC Vorkuta).

International career
He made his international debut for the Central African Republic in 8 June 2013, against South Africa in a 2014 FIFA World Cup qualification match. In the winter of 2013, he represented his country in the 2013 CEMAC Cup, a Non-FIFA tournament where he recorded a goal against Chad. He recorded his first international goal on 24 March 2016, against Madagascar in a 2017 Africa Cup of Nations qualification match. He would record his second international goal once more against Madagascar in the return match on 28 March 2016.

International goals
Scores and results list Central African Republic's goal tally first.

References

1992 births
Living people
People from Bangui
Central African Republic footballers
Central African Republic international footballers
Al-Ahly Shendi players
DFC 8ème Arrondissement players
FC Kyzylzhar players
FC Caspiy players
Association football forwards
Central African Republic expatriate footballers
Central African Republic expatriate sportspeople in Sudan
Expatriate footballers in Sudan
Central African Republic expatriate sportspeople in Kazakhstan
Expatriate footballers in Kazakhstan
Scarborough SC players
Central African Republic expatriate sportspeople in Canada
Expatriate soccer players in Canada
Canadian Soccer League (1998–present) players
Sudan Premier League players
Kazakhstan First Division players